The women's pole vault at the 2017 Asian Athletics Championships was held on 9 July.

Results

References
Results

Pole
Pole vault at the Asian Athletics Championships